Yatharagga is an area associated with a homestead in the mid west of Western Australia (WA) near Yarragadee Station.

The area is also associated with two Australian Earth stations with space related tracking systems at the West Australian Space Centre.

Homestead
The Yatharagga is a homestead listed by the Gazetteer of Australia.

Yatharagga Satellite Station
Yatharagga Satellite Station also known as West Australian Space Centre is owned and run by the Swedish Space Corporation (SSC)'s subsidiary SSC Space Australia, and services a number of government agencies and commercial organisations. It commenced operations under SSC in 2012.

MOBLAS 5 Satellite Laser Ranging Station
Near the homestead is a facility MOBLAS 5 Satellite Laser Ranging (SLR) station originally established by an agreement between the United States of America and Australia effective 27 June 1978 to establish a NASA Temporary Mobile Satellite Laser Tracking Facility.

DORIS (geodesy)
Near the MOBLAS facility is a DORIS (geodesy) beacon, launched by France's CNES.

US Navy Telescope
A US Navy telescope is located adjacent to the MOBLAS 5 SLR.

Dongara Satellite Station
Dongara Satellite Station is adjacent to Yatharagga Satellite Station, and acts as mutual backup to the site.  It is also part of the Swedish Space Corporation, however is owned by the US subsidiary.

References

External links
Carnavon Space Yatharagga: Satellite Laser Ranging (SLR) Station
The Living Moon MOBLAS 5 Satellite Laser Ranging station
SSC Space Australia - Yatharagga Satellite Station
SSC Universal Space Network - Dongara Satellite Station

Earth stations in Western Australia